Materia is the sixth studio album by Italian band Novembre. This album saw Novembre take on a sound consisting of an evident progressive rock influence, with mostly clean vocals and very few growled passages. "The Promise" is a cover of a song by the band Arcadia. "Croma" and "Nothijngrad" were originally written during the writing of Novembrine Waltz, but were unused until this album. These two tracks were a gift for the fans who awaited the release of this album.

Track listing

Personnel

Novembre 
 Carmelo Orlando – vocals, guitars
 Massimiliano Pagliuso – guitars
 Giuseppe Orlando – drums

Additional personnel 
 Fabio Fraschini – bass guitar
 Mika Jussila – mastering
 T. T. Oksala – mixing
 Lucio Muzzi – photography
 Travis Smith – artwork

References

Novembre albums
2006 albums
Albums with cover art by Travis Smith (artist)